Cranzahl station is a railway station in the municipality of Cranzahl, located in the Erzgebirgskreis district in Saxony, Germany.

References

Railway stations in Saxony
Buildings and structures in Erzgebirgskreis